Gabriel Iribarren (born 6 August 1981 in Lanús) is a retired Argentine football player who used to play for Zob Ahan in the Iran Pro League.

Club career
He joined Zob Ahan in 2010 and played in three Iran Pro League matches and seven AFC Champions League matches.

Assists

References

External links
  Argentine Primera statistics

1981 births
Living people
Sportspeople from Lanús
Argentine footballers
Club Atlético Lanús footballers
Tiro Federal footballers
Gimnasia y Esgrima de Jujuy footballers
F.C.V. Dender E.H. players
Zob Ahan Esfahan F.C. players
Argentine Primera División players
Belgian Pro League players
Persian Gulf Pro League players
Argentine expatriate footballers
Expatriate footballers in Belgium
Expatriate footballers in Iran
Association football midfielders